Pionia or Pioniai (Πιονίαι) was a town in the interior of ancient Mysia, on the river Satnioeis, to the northwest of Antandrus, and to the northeast of Gargara. Under the Roman dominion it belonged to the jurisdiction of Adramyttium, and in the ecclesiastical notices it appears as a bishopric of the Hellespontine province. The bishop Aetius represented the city at the Council of Ephesus. No longer the seat of a residential bishop, it remains a titular see of the Roman Catholic Church.

Its site is located near Gömeniç in Asiatic Turkey.

References

Populated places in ancient Mysia
Former populated places in Turkey
Catholic titular sees in Asia
History of Balıkesir Province